Robert Foster (born 1911) was an English professional footballer who played as a goalkeeper for several clubs in the 1930s.

Football career
Foster was born in the Deane district of Bolton and started his football career with local side Farnworth Standard before joining Accrington Stanley in the Football League Third Division North.

After one season, he joined Southampton of the Second Division, where he was signed as cover for Bert Scriven. In his year at The Dell, he made 36 appearances for the reserves, but only managed one appearance in the first team, in a 2–2 draw against Port Vale on 29 August 1932.

In the summer of 1933, Foster moved on to Wrexham and then to Bury. By the summer of 1936, his football career seemed to be over, never having made a first-team appearance for Bury, and he was running a newsagency. In September 1936, he was signed by Oldham Athletic of the Third Division North for whom he made 11 first-team appearances, finishing on the losing side just once.

He finished his career at  Mossley of the Cheshire County League, for whom he made a total of 93 appearances.

References 

1911 births
Footballers from Bolton
English footballers
Association football goalkeepers
English Football League players
Accrington Stanley F.C. (1891) players
Southampton F.C. players
Wrexham A.F.C. players
Bury F.C. players
Oldham Athletic A.F.C. players
Mossley A.F.C. players
Year of death missing